Good as Gold is an album by rock singer-songwriter Eddie Money, released in 1996. It is a budget compendium of top 40 hits and some album songs, and they are all taken from albums from Eddie Money through Can't Hold Back.

References

 https://www.allmusic.com/album/good-as-gold-mw0000232132

1996 compilation albums
Eddie Money compilation albums
Columbia Records compilation albums
Sony Records compilation albums
Albums produced by David Kershenbaum
Albums produced by Bruce Botnick
Albums produced by Tom Dowd